Spjelkavik IL is a Norwegian sports club from the neighborhood Spjelkavik in Ålesund. It has sections for football, handball and skiing, and was founded on 18 March 1932.

Alpine skiers Mona and Nina Løseth represent the club.

The women's football team last played in the top division in 1992. Ann Kristin Aarønes was the top goalscorer during this heyday for the club. Spjelkavik IL currently doesn't have a senior team for women. The men's team currently resides in the 3. divisjon (fourth tier), having last played in the 2. divisjon in 2002. Notable former players include Tor Hogne Aarøy.

References

External links
Official site

Unofficial site: www.spjelkavikil.no

Football clubs in Norway
Association football clubs established in 1932
Sport in Ålesund
1932 establishments in Norway